National Institute of Technology Hamirpur (NIT Hamirpur or NITH) is a public technical university located in Hamirpur, Himachal Pradesh, India. It was declared to be an Institute of National Importance by the Government of India under the Institutes of Technology Act. 

The institute was established in 1984 as a Regional Engineering College. It was upgraded to NIT in 2003 by the parliament of India. NIT Hamirpur offers a comprehensive curriculum for undergraduate, graduate and doctorate studies in various fields of Architecture, engineering, pure sciences and humanities.

History

Foundation

The institute came into existence on 7 August 1986 as Regional Engineering College, Hamirpur in Hamirpur, Himachal Pradesh, India, it was a joint enterprise of the Government of India and the Government of Himachal Pradesh. The classes commenced at Government Polytechnic College, Hamirpur as REC Hamirpur did not have a campus initially. The classes and administration moved to current location in 1987 when few buildings were constructed. At the inception, the institute only had three departments, Civil Engineering, Electrical and Electronics Engineering and Mechanical Engineering. Later, two more departments Electronics and Communication Engineering and Computer Science and Engineering  were added in 1988 and 1989 respectively. The department of Architecture was established in 2000. Recently in 2013, Chemical Engineering department also came into existence. The institute only offered undergraduate courses until 2005, when it started offering graduate and Ph.D programs.

On 26 June 2002, REC Hamirpur was awarded the status of deemed university and upgraded into a National Institute of Technology. As a result of this transition the institute came under the sole purview of the Government of India. It was awarded the status of Institute of National Importance by an Act of Parliament along with other NITs and IITs. NIT Hamirpur has been ranked as best NIT in terms of infrastructure by the World Bank in 2007.

Campus

The institute campus is situated in the Hamirpur district of Himachal Pradesh, India, at an altitude of 900 meters above sea level. The campus is spread across 320 acres and is located on a hilly terrain which is surrounded by pine trees. The distance to campus from main bus terminus of Hamirpur city is approximately 4 kilometres. The nearest situated airport is Kangra airport at 86.9 kilometres. Bus and cab facilities are easily available for the campus.

Being a residential campus, there are eight boys' hostels and four girls' hostels, with residences for the faculty and staff. Some hostels have four-seated or triple-seated rooms, while others have doublets and singlets. Mega Hostel is the newest and largest in its capacity.

Hostels
Boys' Hostels
 Kailash Boys' Hostel
 Shivalik Boys' Hostel
 Dhauladhar Boys' Hostel
 Vindhyachal Boys' Hostel
 Neelkanth Boys' Hostel
 Himadri Hostel
 Himgiri Hostel
 Udaygiri Hostel

Girls' Hostels
 Parvati Girls' Hostel
 Ambika Girls' Hostel
 Aravali Hostel
 Manimahesh Girls' Hostel
 Satpura Hostel

Computer Centre
Computer Centre is a central facility, which caters to the needs of academic departments. The aim of the centre is to provide professional services, promote and assist the use of new computing technology among the students, staff and administration.The website of NITH, is also maintained by the computer center.

Central Library
The institute library was set up in 1986 in one room of Government Polytechnic Hamirpur and was shifted to the institute campus in 1988 in Visvesvarya Block. At present it is in a separate building with the floor area of 3200 square meters. The library has more than 100,000 books and numerous scientific journals in both print and electronic format. The reading halls of the library  can accommodate around 600 people at a time.
Building is facilitated with water coolers, heaters Wi-Fi etc.The library uses OPAC to issue books.

Sports
NIT Hamirpur provides sports facilities for indoor and outdoor games. Teams are sent out to compete in university-level sports competition. Sports facilities include Karate, cricket, football, lawn tennis, basketball, volleyball, table tennis, badminton and athletics. Annaul sports events such as Lalkar is also celebrated with several events such as relay, shot put, 100m race etc. Inter branch and inter year sports matches such as football and cricket are also held round the year.

Health Centre
NIT Hacentre. It is equipped with basic medical facilities and in case of emergency, patients are referred to the Zonal Hospital, Hamirpur.

Organisation and administration

Departments

NIT Hamirpur has 15 departments and 2 centres of excellence. The academic departments at NIT Hamirpur include the following

 Architecture
 Chemical Engineering
 Civil Engineering
 Computer Science and Engineering
 Electrical and Electronics Engineering
 Electronics and Communication Engineering
 Mechanical Engineering
 Industrial Engineering
 Management 
 Humanities 
 Physics
 Chemistry
 Energy and Environment
 Material Science
 Mathematics and Computing
 Statistics

Centres
The two centres of excellence located at NIT Hamirpur are
 
 Centre for Excellence in Energy & Environment
 Centre for Material Science and Engineering

Academics

Ranking 

National Institute of Technology, Hamirpur was ranked 99 among engineering colleges by the National Institutional Ranking Framework (NIRF) in 2021.

Department of Architecture, NIT, Hamirpur was ranked 9 among all Architecture colleges by the National Institutional Ranking Framework (NIRF) in 2018.

Student life

Hill'ffair 

Hill'ffair is a cultural event of the institute, organized at the national level, with the involvement of bands, singers, musicians, artist, poets and participants from all across the country. Two days and three nights of performance with over a wide genre of dance, music, drama. Cultural activities and various student clubs are a few options that act as a catalyst in developing technical, managerial, conceptual skills amongst students. NIT Hamirpur provides a number of such platforms in the forms of clubs to its students to select a club as per his/her likes and channelize their energies in translating their ideas into reality. The event is a three day long event which consists of a star night, where several artists such as

NIMBUS 
NIMBUS is the annual technical festival of National Institute of Technology, Hamirpur, Himachal Pradesh, India. It is touted to be an amalgamation of ideas, expressions, innovations, prototypes, knowledge channels, taken to the most premier levels.
In NIMBUS all the departmental teams compete with their best projects, demonstrations and Events.
Students from himachal and outside himachal Pradesh come to participate in 

these events. There are two types of teams, core and departmental teams. The departmantal teams are:

OJAS (Electrical Engg)
 MEDEXTROUS (Mechanical Engg)
 VIBHAV (Electronics & Comm)
 C HELIX (Civil Engg)
 Hermetica (Chemical Engg)
 Team .EXE (Computer Science and Engineering)
 Design O Crats (Architecture)
 Metamorph (Material science engg)
 Matcom(MnC Department)

and the core teams are:

 Team Finance and Treasury
 Resurgence
 Pixonoids
 Public Relations
 Music Club
 Rhythmeecz
 Discipline Club
 Organisation Club
 Fine Art Club
 Team Technical

Lalkaar

National Institute of Technology Hamirpur is one of the premier technical institutes in Northern India. The Institute presently provides sports facilities for both outdoor and indoor activity. A standard size stadium with provision of pavilion has been provided to the student where the games like Cricket, Football, Basketball, Volleyball, Lawn Tennis martial art karate for self defense and Athletics are played. Student's Activity Center(SAC) is recently build with world class facilities to host various extra-curricular activities by the students.

Notable alumni
Prof. Dr.-Ing. habil. Mohit Kumar, Professor for "Computational Intelligence in Automation (apl)" at the University of Rostock, Germany  and Key Researcher at Software Competence Center Hagenberg, Austria.
Vijay Kumar Thakur, scientist in Manufacturing Enhanced Composites & Structures Centre. at Cranfield University.
Mr Nitesh Gupta, Director Engineering at Intel Corporation.
Kumar Vijay Mishra, ARL Senior Fellow, US Army Research Laboratory.
Mr. Samneet Thakur, Data Scientist, ISRO

See also
 Dr. B. R. Ambedkar National Institute of Technology Jalandhar
 National Institute of Technology, Kurukshetra
 National Institute of Technology, Jamshedpur
 National Institute of Technology, Warangal

References

External links

 

National Institutes of Technology
Engineering colleges in Himachal Pradesh
Hamirpur, Himachal Pradesh
Educational institutions established in 1986
1986 establishments in Himachal Pradesh
Education in Hamirpur district, Himachal Pradesh
All India Council for Technical Education